is an East Japan Railway Company (JR East) railway station on the Hanawa Line in the city of Hachimantai, Iwate Prefecture, Japan.

Lines

Station layout
Tairadate Station has a single ground-level side platform serving a single bi-directional track. The station is unattended.

History
Tairadate Station opened on August 27, 1922, as a station serving the village of Tairadate. The station was absorbed into the JR East network upon the privatization of JNR on April 1, 1987.

Surrounding area
National Route 282
Tairadate Post Office

See also
 List of Railway Stations in Japan

References

External links

  

Hanawa Line
Railway stations in Japan opened in 1922
Railway stations in Iwate Prefecture
Stations of East Japan Railway Company
Hachimantai, Iwate